The Masters of the Universe media franchise has appeared in several comic book series. Most were small publications (known as "minicomics"), which were included as bonuses with action figures. Standalone comic-book series were also published by DC, Marvel Comics, London Edition Magazines and Image Comics.

Publication history

Original Mattel minicomics (1981)
The original action figures were packaged with minicomics, with stories about the characters. Written by Don Glut and illustrated by Alfredo P. Alcala, these first 4 stories in booklet form had one image per page with text underneath. In the early comics He-Man is a wandering barbarian on Eternia, a world dealing with the aftermath of a war which devastated its civilizations and left behind fantastic machinery and weapons. The war opened a rift between dimensions, allowing the evil warlord Skeletor to travel to Eternia. Skeletor has set his sights on the ancient Castle Grayskull, a fortress of mystery and power; whoever controls Grayskull will become Master of the Universe. To prevent Skeletor from achieving his goal, He-Man has received special powers and weapons from the Sorceress and defends the castle from Skeletor. To distinguish these stories from the minicomics which were released as tie-ins with the TV series, fans called this first version of Eternia "mini-Eternia" (or "Min-Eternia") or more commonly "savage Eternia"

DC Comics minicomics (1982)
When the "Wave 2" minicomics were produced by DC Comics. They changed many aspects from original 4 booklets. Written by Cary Cohn and illustrated by Mark Texeira. He-Man no longer is a wandering barbarian, but resides at the Royal Palace and is supported by allies such as Man-At-Arms (the Eternian master of weapons) whom DC changed to be the adoptive father to Teela. Skeletor finds one half of the Power Sword, the key to Castle Grayskull. He-Man received the other half from the Sorceress, and must prevent Skeletor from linking the two halves and gaining access to the castle. DC Comics introduced many new elements like a King and Queen, the Royal Palace as well as more scifi-themed villains Trap Jaw to the stories.

DC Comics inserts and limited comics series (1982)
Debuting in DC Comics Presents issue #47 (dated July 1982), the series crossed over to the DC Universe in a story that was a team-up with Superman and drawn by the great Curt Swan. The story continued in a Masters of the Universe insert preview titled "Fate is the Killer", which appeared in several DC Comics comic books dated November 1982. The following month, a Masters of the Universe limited series was published, written by Paul Kupperberg and pencilled by George Tuska, which lasted for three issues.

International MOTU comic series (1983-1990)
Original comic-book content was also created in Germany by Interpart/Condor Verlag for 18 issues, Ehapa Verlag for 21 issues (also appearing in their Micky Maus comics) and also by Mattel itself. Both the German and British comics were often translated to provide content for other countries (although some comic books from Ledafilms of Argentina and Editora Abril of Brazil, along with Italy's Più and Magic Boy magazines provided some original material in their pages as well).

Later Mattel minicomics (1985–1987)
With the introduction of Hordak, the minicomics began to diverge from the He-Man and She-Ra animated series and Etheria became Hordak's base of operations.

Years earlier, Hordak had been overthrown by his minion Skeletor and banished from Eternia. He returns, accompanied by the Evil Horde, to conquer the planet. Occasionally allying with Skeletor (but usually attempting to destroy him), Hordak is opposed by He-Man.

In the mini-comic King of the Snakemen, Skeletor discovers a pool of energy buried in Snake Mountain which contains ancient emperor King Hiss. Hiss discloses that he had conquered a number of planets before invading Eternia. Large portions of the planet had fallen to the Snake Men before they were defeated by the Council of the Elders and banished to another dimension. Hiss now seeks to recover his fellow Snake Men and bring vengeance to Eternia.

Details about Eternia's past are revealed in subsequent minicomics surrounding the Three Towers: Grayskull Tower, Viper Tower and Central Tower. The giant structure is raised from underground by Hiss and Skeletor and is the focus of adventures as He-Man tries to prevent all three villains from acquiring the towers' secrets.

Hordak recognises the towers, and claims to have helped build Central Tower. The return of the Towers enhances the Sorceress' magic, and she helps King Randor in his search to discover what happened to his long-lost brother Keldor. Skeletor is determined to stop the search.

Princess of Power minicomics (1984-1986)
Included with the She-Ra dolls beginning in 1985, these differed from the cartoon series. She-Ra used the Crystal Castle as her home, and Catra (rather than Hordak) is the primary villain.

Marvel Star Comics series (1986-1988)
Marvel's Star Comics imprint published 13 issues in 1986–88 and an adaptation of the live-action movie in 1987. Among the creators were Mike Carlin and Ron Wilson. Within the Marvel Multiverse, it is designated as Earth-86051.

UK magazines (1986-1991)
First published in the UK by London Editions Magazines, the fortnightly comic series lasted for 72 issues between 1986 and 1988, with an additional comic (Masters of the Universe Adventure) running for 28 issues between 1988 and 1991. Storylines included the battle for control of Viper Tower, a team-up of the three villainous factions and the destruction and rebuilding of Eternos. The 'Secret Files of Scrollos' strip featured origin stories for many characters including Sy-Klone, Rio Blast and Modulok, and the series included the characters of Horde Prime and Scrollos. There was also a short-lived She-Ra comic title that lasted for 14 issues between 1986 and 1987, with 3 specials including the 'Twins of Power' special featuring both He-Man and She-Ra. The later issues of both the fortnightly MOTU comic and the Adventure Magazine reprinted stories from the German MOTU comics published by Ehapa, translated into English. In September 1989 the latter comic was renamed 'He-Man Adventure' and was now based on the 'New Adventures' toy line, again reprinting stories from the German Ehapa comics until the comic was discontinued in 1991.

Newspaper comic strip (1986-1991)
A newspaper comic strip, He-Man and the Masters of the Universe, was produced from July 20, 1986 until 1991, written by James Shull and Chris Weber and distributed by McNaught Syndicate. While most American newspapers dropped the strip mid-run, it was translated and distributed around the world.

Fifteen storylines were presented over the course of the run. The complete run (minus a small number of "lost strips") was published in 2017 by Dark Horse Comics as He-Man and the Masters of the Universe: The Newspaper Comic Strips.

He-Man minicomics (1989)
Four minicomics were included with the 1989 space-themed relaunch. The story was similar to the UK magazine version of He-Man's New Adventures, differing from the cartoon series.

2000s MVC and Image Comics series (2002–2005)
From 2002 to 2005 Image Comics and MVCreations published several series of comics and one-shots that mirrored tales of the 2002 Mike Young Productions show; the comic series elaborated and added to the mythos by introducing characters that never made it in after the 39 episodes of the television series. The first issues were seen in the summer of 2002 in the form of special promotional/preview issues, with three mini-series continuing on after; 'The Shards of Darkness' in fall 2002, followed by 'Dark Reflections' and 'Rise of the Snake Men' in 2003. After delving into the back-stories of Skeletor's henchmen Beast-Man, Mer-Man, Trap-Jaw and Tri-Klops in a four issue 'Icons of Evil' series, a short-lived ongoing series, solely produced by MVC, continued on for eight issues in 2004. Along with these, a handful of special or 'pack-in' one-shots and trade paperback collected volumes were also produced.

Dark Horse / DC minicomics (2011-2015)
Dark Horse Comics produced the first three minicomics for inclusion in Mattel's Masters of the Universe Classics toy line, continuing the series of minicomics introduced in the 1980s Masters toys. The minicomics were written by Tim Seeley and drawn by Wellinton Alves, with covers by Eric Powell. According to Seeley, these minicomics would conclude the story originally planned to be the new direction of the 1980s action-figure line before it was cancelled. The story dealt with the Powers of Grayskull line, which included King Hiss and He-Ro, tying the toy continuity to the He-Man line and known as The New Adventures of He-Man. Seeley said that this comic line was intended to blend the He-Man continuities and select the best stories and ideas from MOTU history.

DC took over the Masters of the Universe Classics minicomics in 2012, with artwork by Wellinton Alves and Axel Gimenez. Five more minicomics were published to be included with the MOTU Classics line action-figures; the first told the origin story of Keldor (Skeletor), the second dealt with He-Man and Skeletor's final battle after their intergalactic New Adventures. The third begins ushering in the Son of He-Man era (introduced as a new series concept by Lou Scheimer in the 1990s, but never produced); which then continues for two more issues, culminating in the Third Ultimate Battleground.

DC Comics (2012-2020)

A Masters of the Universe comic book series was relaunched by DC Comics in June 2012, first appearing as a series of digital comics. This was quickly followed by a six issue mini-series and all new revised origin issues for He-Man, Skeletor and Hordak.  After a crossover mini-series with superheroes from the DC Comics universe in 2013, an ongoing series ran for 19 issues through 2014, before being replaced by the 'He-Man The Eternity War' 15 issue series in 2015/2016. This introduced a new back-story for He-man's sister She-ra (as Despara), Skeletor (as the half-Garn son of King Miro), Hordak, and the Snakemen; moving the storyline further along, with a new Horde invasion of Eternia and He-Man taking the Eternian throne, amongst other new developments. He-Man/ThunderCats, a crossover with another heroic 1980's action figure line, ThunderCats, was also produced for 6 issues in 2016–2017. The current DC Masters of the Universe property is a 6-part crossover series with DC Comics' Injustice Storyline. The last comic book series from this run by DC Comics was He-Man and the Masters of the Multiverse 6-issue limited series released from 2019-2020.

Dark Horse Comics (2021) 

On July 7, 2021, Dark Horse Comics released the first issue of the four issue miniseries that serves as a prequel to the animated series Masters of the Universe Revelation released by Netflix.

List of minicomics
The following is a list of the mini-comics released with the Masters of the Universe, Princess of Power, He-Man, and Masters of the Universe Classics toys.

Original minicomics
He-Man and the Power Sword (1981)
King of Castle Grayskull (1981)
Battle in the Clouds (1981)
The Vengeance of Skeletor (1981)

Second series minicomics
He-Man Meets Ram-Man (1982)
The Ordeal of Man-E-Faces (1982)
The Terror of Tri-Klops (1982)
The Menace of Trap Jaw (1982)
The Tale of Teela (1982)
The Magic Stealer! (1982)
The Power of...Point Dread! (1982)

Third (Filmation MOTU) series minicomics
Dragon's Gift (1983) (based on the TV episode "The Dragon's Gift")
Masks of Power (1983) (based on the TV episode "Masks of Power")
The Secret Liquid of Life (1983) (based on the TV episode "Valley of Power")
He-Man and the Insect People (1983)
Double-Edged Sword (1983) (based on the TV episode "Double Edged Sword")
The Temple of Darkness! (1983) (based on the TV episode "Temple of The Sun")
Slave City (1983) (based on the TV episode "A Tale of Two Cities")
The Siege of Avion (1983) (based on the TV episodes "Reign of the Monster" and "Betrayal of Stratos")
The Clash of Arms (1983)

Fourth series minicomics
The Obelisk (1984)
Skeletor's Dragon (1984)
The Battle of Roboto (1984)
Spikor Strikes (1984)
The Stench of Evil! (1984)
Grizzlor - The Legend Comes Alive! (1984)
Leech: The Master of Power Suction Unleashed! (1984)
Mantenna and the Menace of the Evil Horde! (1984)
Hordak: The Ruthless Leader's Revenge! (1984)
The Treachery of Modulok (1984)

Fifth series minicomics
The Flying Fists of Power! (1985)
Rock People to the Rescue! (1985)
King of the Snake Men (1985)
The Terror Claws Strike! (1985)
Escape from the Slime Pit! (1985)
The Menace of Multi-Bot! (1985)
The Warrior Machine! (1985)
Eye of the Storm (1985)
The Fastest Draw in the Universe (1985)
The Hordes of Hordak (1985)
Between a Rock and a Hard Place! (1985)
Snake Attack! (1985)
The Ultimate Battleground! (1986)

Sixth series minicomics
The Search for Keldor (1986)
Enter...Buzz-Saw Hordak! (1986)
Revenge of the Snake Men! (1986)
Energy Zoids (1986)
The Powers of Grayskull - The Legend Begins! (1986)
The Cosmic Key (1987)

Princess of Power minicomics
The Story of She-Ra (1984)
Journey to Mizar (1984)
The Hidden Symbols Mystery (1984)
Disappearing Treasures (1984)
Adventure of the Blue Diamond (1984)
Across the Crystal Light Barrier (1985)
A Fishy Business! (1985)
A Most Unpleasant Present (1985)
A Born Champion (1985)
Fantastic Fashions (1985)
Don't Rain on my Parade! (1986)
Where Hope Has Gone (1986)

He-Man (New Adventures) minicomics
The New Adventure (1989)
Skeletor's Journey (1989)
Battle For The Crystal (1989)
The Revenge of Skeletor! (1989)

MOTU Classics series minicomics
The Powers of Grayskull Part One: The Legend Begins! (2011)
The Powers of Grayskull Part Two: He-Ro Unleashed! (2012)
The Powers of Grayskull Part Three: Battle for the Fate of the Universe! (2012)
The Secret Origin of Skeletor! (2013)
He-Man vs Skeletor - Their Final Battle! (2014)
The Fall of Eternia Part One - Homecoming! (2015)
The Fall of Eternia Part Two - Together Again For The First Time! (2015)
The Fall of Eternia Part Three - The Third Ultimate Battleground (2015)

Collected editions
Many of the comic books were collected into trade paperbacks:

Dark Horse collected editions 
The minicomics books have been collected into a hardcover anthology collection by Dark Horse Books:
 He-Man and the Masters of the Universe Minicomic Collection (collects all of the original Masters of the Universe, Princess of Power, He-Man, and the first three Masters of the Universe Classics minicomics; all of which originally came with the action figures, 1232 pages, Dark Horse Comics, October 2015)

The complete run of the newspaper comic strip produced from July 20, 1986 until 1991 (minus a small number of "lost strips") was published in 2017 by Dark Horse Comics:
 He-Man and the Masters of the Universe: The Newspaper Comic Strips (collects complete run 1986–1991, Dark Horse Comics, 2017)

MVCreations collected editions 
 Volume 1: The Shard of Darkness (collects Masters of the Universe (2002) #1-4, 112 pages, MVCreations, November 2005)
 Volume 2: Dark Reflections (collects Masters of the Universe (2003) #1-6, 112 pages, MVCreations, June 2004)
 Masters of the Universe: Icons of Evil (collects Tri-Klops, Trapjaw, Mer-Man and Beastman one-shots, 176 pages, April 2004, MVCreations)

DC collected editions 

DC has collected editions of their various current Masters of the Universe comic series, which began in 2012.

References

External links

 

1982 comics debuts
1986 comics debuts
2002 comics debuts
2004 comics debuts
Comics characters introduced in 1982
Comics based on films
Comics based on television series
Comics based on toys
DC Comics titles
Star Comics titles
CrossGen titles
Image Comics titles
Comics
Minicomics
Science fantasy comics
Science fiction comics
Works based on Mattel toys
Comics set on fictional planets